P.A.Deepak (Adrushta Deepak Pallikonda) is a mix engineer and record producer. He won the 2010 Grammy Award for the "Best Compilation Soundtrack for Visual Media" for the movie Slumdog Millionaire.

Deepak is also a recipient of a Certificate Of Honour in the year 2015 from The Recording Academy in recognition of his participation as Surround Mix Engineer on the Grammy Award Winning recording Winds of Samsara in the category Grammy Award for Best New Age Album of 57th Annual Grammy Awards.

Awards and recognition

Career

Deepak started his career as a guitarist and later became a recording engineer. Apart from being a full-time mix engineer, he plays various string instruments and does music programming out of passion & interest.

He is currently collaborating with various renowned artists and performing as a mix engineer & music producer.

His works
As a musician, he played guitar and oud for the movie Raavan. He has done music programming for various songs and of which the Blue Theme was described as a Killer Mix.

Deepak worked as a music composer for the film Boss in which, the single Hum Na Tode, is an adapted track of the popular Tamil song composed by Vidyasagar, Appadi Podu. This track – boasted of ferocious and aggressive vocals by Vishal Dadlani, adapted by P. A. Deepak and lyrics by Kumaar which consolidated the album's positive impact on its audiences.

Deepak mixed the Deluxe Edition of 'Winds of Samsara' in 5.1 Blu-ray HD Surround Sound that won the 57th Grammy Award for Best New Age Album. 'Winds of Samsara' was the first collaboration between award-winning South African flautist Wouter Kellerman and award-winning Indian Composer/Producer/Artist Ricky Kej. The Album headed to the Number 1 spot on the Billboard New Age Charts.

The Recording Academy previously known as 'NARAS' or National Academy of Recording Arts & Sciences presented a Certificate Of Honour to Deepak in recognition of his participation as Surround Mix Engineer on the Grammy Award Winning recording 'Winds of Samsara' in the category of Grammy Award for Best New Age Album of 57th Annual Grammy Awards in the year 2015.

The Recording Academy feted Deepak in appreciation and recognition of 15 years of membership with the academy. And for supporting The academy's mission to improve the environment for music and the lives of all members of their community in the year 2017.

Personal life
Deepak is married to Ramani. They have two sons.

Discography
This is a partial discography

References

External links

Living people
Grammy Award winners
Indian male musicians
1982 births
Telugu people
21st-century Indian composers
21st-century male musicians
Grammy Award for Best Compilation Soundtrack for Visual Media